Stephen Tedja (Arabic:ستيفن تيدجا) (born 7 December 1991) is a Qatari born-Nigerian footballer.

External links
 

1991 births
Living people
Nigerian footballers
Qatari footballers
Mesaimeer SC players
Al Sadd SC players
Naturalised citizens of Qatar
Qatar Stars League players
Qatari Second Division players
Association football goalkeepers